Cristiano da Silva Leite (born 29 August 1993), commonly known as Cris Silva or simply Cristiano, is a Brazilian footballer, who plays for Chapecoense, on loan from Fluminense.

Career
On 22 June 2017, Cris Silva signed for FC Sheriff Tiraspol. On 14 November 2019, Cristiano extended his contract with Sheriff Tiraspol, which was due to end at the end of the 2020 season.

Career statistics

Club

Honours
Sheriff Tiraspol
Moldovan National Division: 2017, 2018, 2019
Moldovan Cup: 2018–19

References

External links

1993 births
Living people
Brazilian footballers
Moldovan Super Liga players
Campeonato Brasileiro Série A players
Campeonato Brasileiro Série B players
Campeonato Brasileiro Série C players
Campeonato Brasileiro Série D players
Murici Futebol Clube players
Clube de Regatas Brasil players
Criciúma Esporte Clube players
Volta Redonda FC players
Bonsucesso Futebol Clube players
FC Sheriff Tiraspol players
Fluminense FC players
Associação Chapecoense de Futebol players
Association football defenders
Brazilian expatriate footballers
Expatriate footballers in Moldova
Brazilian expatriate sportspeople in Moldova
Sportspeople from Niterói